Bozorgabad (also Romanized as Bozorgābād; also known as Zarkābād, Ziurgābād, and Zurgābād) is a village in Baranduzchay-ye Jonubi Rural District, in the Central District of Urmia County, West Azerbaijan Province, Iran. At the 2006 census, its population was 210, in 58 families.

References 

Populated places in Urmia County